Philip Nanton (born 1947) is a Vincentian writer, poet and spoken-word performer, based in Barbados. A sociologist by training, who also teaches cultural studies, he is Honorary Research Associate at the University of Birmingham, and lectures at the University of the West Indies, Cave Hill. He has been a contributor on Caribbean culture and literature to journals and magazines such as the Caribbean Review of Books, Shibboleths: a Journal of Theory and Criticism and Caribbean Quarterly, and as a spoken-word artist has performed his work at festivals internationally. In 2012, he represented St. Vincent & the Grenadines at Poetry Parnassus in London.

Nanton's published books include Island Voices: From St Christopher to the Barracudas and Frontiers of the Caribbean (2014), Canouan Suite and Other Pieces (2016), and Riff: The Shake Keane Story (2021).

Biography 
Born in St Vincent & the Grenadines, Philip Nanton studied and lived in England between 1960 and 2000, when he relocated to Barbados. He began his career in British local government policymaking, and  completed his D.Phil at the University of Sussex (1986), following which he combined academic work with being a creative writer. Among his publications are two edited anthologies of literary criticism. He has written of his "personal journey, away from conventional disciplinary analysis, primarily sociological, to the use of creative expression for social analysis in the context of the Caribbean."

Among universities where he has taught, as well as performed work, are the University of Birmingham in England, St. Georges University in Grenada, the University of Missouri-St. Louis and, currently, the University of the West Indies, Cave Hill, in Barbados.

Also a broadcaster, Nanton has made radio documentaries on Caribbean literature and culture, including presenting for BBC Radio 4 in 1998 What Does Mr Swanzy Want?, the story of Caribbean Voices, an influential programme of the 1940s and '50s, and its producer Henry Swanzy.

In 2008, Nanton produced a spoken-word CD entitled Island Voices from St Christopher & the Barracudas, which was the basis of a 2014 book of the same name published by Papillote Press.

His collection of creative writings Canouan Suite and Other Pieces, a finalist for the 2014 Hollick Arvon Prize for Caribbean Writers (now the Emerging Caribbean Writers Prize) at the Bocas Lit Fest, was published in 2016 by Papillote Press, and was highly recommended for a 2018 Casa de las Américas Prize for Anglophone Caribbean Literature. In 2017, Nanton published Frontiers of the Caribbean (Manchester University Press), described by Robert Edison Sandiford as a "blend of the 'scholarly' and the 'creative'."

Nanton's most recently published book is Riff: The Shake Keane Story (2021), a biography of the Vincentian jazz musician and poet Shake Keane. Reviewing Riff (which Nanton dedicates to photojournalist and historian Val Wilmer), jazz critic John Fordham wrote: "Nanton is closely attuned to the expressiveness of the local Creole-derived dialect's vowel-stretches and musicality, and to those issues of migration, masculinity and nationalism that profoundly shaped his subject's life. ...Philip Nanton's fine book opens a window on both a jazz story and a literary story that the chroniclers of both fields have largely bypassed." In Caribbean Intelligence, John Stevenson's review concluded: "Nanton admirably succeeds in writing a highly engaging account of one of the Caribbean’s legendary creative forces."

Bibliography

Books 
 (As editor) Remembering the Sea: An Introduction to Frank A. Collymore (2004)
 Island Voices from St. Christopher and the Barracudas (Papillote Press, 2014)
 Canouan Suite and Other Pieces, poetry (Papillote Press, 2016)
 Frontiers of the Caribbean, monograph (Manchester University Press, 2017)
 Riff: The Shake Keane Story, biography (Papillote Press, 2021)

Selected articles 
 "What Does Mr. Swanzy Want – Shaping or Reflecting? An Assessment of Henry Swanzy's Contribution to the Development of Caribbean Literature", Caribbean Quarterly, Vol. 46, No. 1 (March 2000), pp. 61–72. Originally in Kunapipi Vol. XX, No. 1 (1998).
 "London Calling", Caribbean Beat, Issue 63, September/October 2003.
 "Frank A. Collymore: A Man of the Threshold", Kunapipi, Vol. 26, Issue 1, 2004.
  "The man who loved to have fun" (on Frank Collymore). Caribbean Beat (65), January–February 2004.
 "Caribbean 'frontier societies' like St Vincent are defined by the ever-present interplay between the civilised and the wild", London School of Economics, 10 December 2018.
 "Belonging and a Sense of Place", Writers Mosaic, 2021.

References

External links 
 Official website
 Audios and Videos
 "The Power of Caribbean Poetry: Word & Sound | Poetry Entertainment: Philip Nanton", Sounds – Arts, literature & performance, British Library, 20 September 2012.
 Philip Nanton at Writers Mosaic, an initiative of the Royal Literary Fund.

Alumni of the University of Sussex
Living people
Saint Vincent and the Grenadines expatriates in Barbados
Saint Vincent and the Grenadines writers
Spoken word artists
1947 births
University of the West Indies academics
Academics of the University of Birmingham